= Tanzplattform Deutschland =

Tanzplattform Deutschland is a theatre festival in Germany.
